El Hassaine-Béni Yahi is a town and commune in Mostaganem Province, Algeria. It is located in Aïn Nouïssy District.

Communes of Mostaganem Province